Directors Guild of Slovenia (DSR - Društvo slovenskih režiserjev) represents the interests of film and television directors in the Slovenian motion picture industry. It was founded in 2005. This organization is a full member of La Fédération Européenne des Réalisateurs de l'Audiovisuel (FERA).

Presidents 

 2005–2006 - Janez Lapajne
 2006–2010 - Martin Srebotnjak
 2010–present - Miha Hočevar

External links 
Official DSR website

Entertainment industry unions
Non-profit organizations based in Slovenia
Film organizations in Slovenia
Organizations established in 2005
2005 establishments in Slovenia